Darin Ahmad (born 1 January 1979 in Hama, Syria) is a Syrian artist, poet and writer.

Biography 
After finishing school in her home town, she went to Aleppo in 1996 to study economics. After graduating from the University of Aleppo in July 2004, she lived in Damascus and has worked as a web designer and editor for the internet magazine Maaber. Since winter 2012, Darin Ahmad has lived with her family in Berlin. In addition to her poems, Darin Ahmad has been painting since 2015. Her paintings were featured in Alitihad Culture Newspaper in July 2017, BeiNNehreen Newspaper in October 2018 and Mirit Magazine in May 2019, following an article about Darin Ahmad at Al-Arab Newspaper in September 2016 and an interview at eSyria published in March 2018. In June 2019 she published an article in The New Arab with the title This day is still mine and in August 2019 the article Need of the central. Further articles and poems are published at Maaber Magazine, beginning in 2004 till today.

Exhibitions 
Darin Ahmad exhibited her work for the first time within the exhibition Fluchtpunkt together with Kefah Ali Deeb, Fouad El-Auwad, Akram Hamza and Adnan Sharbaji from May to July 2016 in the Institut Francais, Bonn, with the support of ArtDialog e. V. and the German-Arabic Poetry-Salon, under the patronage of the Mayor of Bonn, Ashok Sridharan.

Another exhibition together with Frances Aviva Blane Two Faces was shown from July 2016 to January 2017 at the residence of the German ambassador in London.
 
 In February and March 2017 Ahmad's work were on view at the Crypt Gallery in London as part of the exhibition Radical Love: Female Lust. Furthermore, the work of Darin Ahmad was permanently exhibited at the Palais am Festungsgraben in Berlin-Mitte at the offices of Kiron Open Higher Education from January 2017 to May 2019.

References

External links 
 Webpage Darin Ahmad
 Facebookpage Darin Ahmad
 Instagrampage Darin Ahmad
 Twitterpage Darin Ahmad
 YouTube Channel Darin Ahmad
 Singulart Page Darin Ahmad
 Saatchi Art Page Darin Ahmad
 artebooking Page Darin Ahmad
 Flickrpage Darin Ahmad
 Maaber Magazin

1979 births
Living people
Syrian artists
Syrian poets